Way of the Scorpion could refer to:
Legend of the Five Rings
Way of the Tiger